Two ships captured from the French have served the British Royal Navy under the name HMS Decouverte.

HMS Decouverte was a French navy schooner launched in 1800, captured in 1803, decommissioned in 1806, and sold in 1808.
  was the French schooner Eclipse, launched in 1804, captured in 1806, commissioned as the gun-brig Decouverte, and sold in 1816.   

Royal Navy ship names